Project Wyze was a Canadian rap metal band active from 1996 before breaking up in 2003 to pursue their side-project Dead Celebrity Status.

History
Emcees Yas Taalat and Bobby McIntosh started out as a hip hop duo under the name of Project Wyze in 1988 when they were teenagers in Sudbury, Ontario. While attending high school, Project Wyze established a reputable image in the underground hip-hop scene by opening for acts such as Dream Warriors, Maestro Fresh Wes and Michie Mee. They were also one of the first Canadian groups to open for the American hip-hop group, Public Enemy.

The pair subsequently moved to London, Ontario after high school. In 1995, Yas and Bobby were invited to perform with a punk rock band.
The two groups decided to merge. The hip-hop group Project Wyze evolved into a rap rock band including members Adam Arsenault (guitar), and Tye Thomas (bass). The band started writing new music and they released their first EP, Trapz of Poetic Poison, on an indie label in 1996. Project Wyze toured the United States in 1998, performing with artists like Papa Roach and the Step Kings.

After the success of the first EP, the band enlisted the talents of Sasha Kosovic (guitar), Brad Dean (drums) and Elie Abdelnour (bass) to round out the line-up. In 2000, with the new band established, Project Wyze released a longer sophomore EP, Only If I Knew. Growing record sales and an expanding fan base grabbed the attention of major labels.  They subsequently signed to Sony Music and released their major label debut, Misfits.strangers.liars.friends, in 2001. That album spawned the Canadian hit singles "Nothing's What it Seems" and "Room to Breathe".  Their major label debut, misfits.strangers.liars.friends, was released in 2001. That year the band performed at Edgefest II in Toronto.  

After internal conflicts, members of the band started to disband. Yas and Bobby formed Dead Celebrity Status as a side project. It later became a main project in which both of the vocalists devote their time to.

Discography
 Trapz of Poetic Poison – EP (1996)
 Only If I Knew (1999)
 misfits.strangers.liars.friends (2001)

References

External links
 Project Wyze at MuchMusic.com
 Project Wyze at Myspace

Musical groups established in 1988
Musical groups disestablished in 2003
Musical groups from Greater Sudbury
Canadian hip hop groups
Rapcore groups
Rap metal musical groups
1988 establishments in Ontario
2003 disestablishments in Ontario
Canadian nu metal musical groups